Sander Vereijken (born 5 April 1997) is a Dutch professional footballer who plays as a left winger or attacking midfielder.

Career
Born in Helmond, Vereijken played for Mierlo-Hout and VV Gemert before, in the summer of 2019, Vereijken joined Eerste Divisie side Helmond Sport on a two-year contract with the option for a further year. He made his debut for Helmond Sport on 9 August 2019 in a 1–1 draw at home to FC Volendam, Helmond Sport's first game of the season.

His contract with Helmond Sport was terminated by mutual consent on 20 July 2022.

References

External links
 

1997 births
Living people
Dutch footballers
Association football wingers
Association football midfielders
Sportspeople from Helmond
Helmond Sport players
Eerste Divisie players
Footballers from North Brabant